Eskimo was the brand name of home appliances (refrigerators, freezers, kitchen ovens, heaters, TV sets etc.) produced by Viometal Eskimo, a Greek company founded in 1958. The spectacular development of this company (by 1973 it employed over 1500 and held a 27% stake of the Greek home appliances market) was followed by a disastrous merger with Izola, a former competitor, in 1977. The new company (Elinda, for [H]ellenic Industry of Appliances) went bankrupt after a few years, while a branch of the former company survived, focusing on trading and TV assembly. In 2001 it merged with F.G. Europe, a Greek electric and electronic appliance trading company.

References/External links 
Eskimo history 
L.S. Skartsis, "Greek Vehicle & Machine Manufacturers 1800 to present: A Pictorial History", Marathon (2012)  (eBook)

Home appliance manufacturers of Greece
Defunct manufacturing companies of Greece
Manufacturing companies established in 1958
Manufacturing companies disestablished in 2001
Greek brands
2001 disestablishments in Greece
Greek companies established in 1958